
Gmina Czosnów is a rural gmina (administrative district) in Nowy Dwór County, Masovian Voivodeship, in east-central Poland.

Villages
Gmina Czosnów contains the villages and settlements of Adamówek, Aleksandrów, Augustówek, Brzozówka, Cybulice, Cybulice Duże, Cybulice Małe, Cząstków Mazowiecki, Cząstków Polski, Czeczotki, Czosnów, Dąbrówka, Dębina, Dobrzyń, Izabelin-Dziekanówek, Janów-Mikołajówka, Janówek, Jesionka, Kaliszki, Kazuń Nowy, Kazuń Polski, Kazuń-Bielany, Kiścinne, Łomna, Łomna Las, Łosia Wólka, Małocice, Palmiry, Pieńków, Sady, Sowia Wola, Sowia Wola Folwarczna, Truskawka, Wiersze, Wólka Czosnowska and Wrzosówka.

Neighbouring gminas
Gmina Czosnów is bordered by the town of Nowy Dwór Mazowiecki and by the gminas of Izabelin, Jabłonna, Leoncin, Leszno, Łomianki and Zakroczym.

References

External links
Polish official population figures 2006

Czosnow
Nowy Dwór Mazowiecki County